Love Me When You Can is a 2006 South Korean morning soap opera broadcast by MBC starring Ha Hee-ra, Kim Yoon-seok, Kim Bo-ra and Lee Min-jung. The series was directed by Jang Geun-soo and Kim Woo-sun. It premiered on July 9, 2006 and ended on April 18, 2007, airing every Mondays to Fridays at 7:50 a.m. for 186 episodes.

Synopsis
After discovering her husband's affair, Oh Sun-ae (Ha Hee-ra) tries to start a new life, but when the past (along with the new woman) just won't go away, moving on is not easy. Still, Oh Sun-ae is determined.

Cast

Ha family

Ha Hee-ra as Oh Sun-ae (housewife for 13 years)
Kim Yoon-seok as Ha Dong-gyu (husband, businessman)
Kim Bo-ra as Ha Yoo-mi (daughter) 
Lee Min-jung as Ha Jung-hwa (Dong-gyu's sister) 
Sunwoo Yong-nyeo as Park Geum-rae (Dong-gyu's mother)

Oh family

Park Hyung-joon as Oh Seung-hyun (Sun-ae's brother) 
Kim Jung-nan as Jo Eun-soo (Seung-hyun's wife) 
Shin Choong-sik as Sun-ae's father

Extended cast

Byun Woo-min as Kang Jin-woo (child psychologist)
Han Da-min as Lee Ji-hye (Jin-woo's nurse receptionist)
Ji Soo-won as Bae Young-jo (model agency supervisor) 
Lee Hyun-kyung as Goh Yu-jin (single mom, Young-jo's best friend)
Kyung Joon as Yoo Hwan (Ha Jung-hwa's boyfriend) 
Han Eun-sun as Jin-woo's arranged date
Kim Dong-bum  as Oh Hyun-soo

See also
List of South Korean dramas

References

External links
  

MBC TV television dramas
2006 South Korean television series debuts
2007 South Korean television series endings
Korean-language television shows
South Korean romance television series
Television series by JS Pictures